Ivanhoe is a suburb of Melbourne, Victoria, Australia,  north-east of Melbourne's Central Business District, located within the City of Banyule local government area. Ivanhoe recorded a population of 13,374 at the 2021 census.

History

Greenway's Ivanhoe Hotel was opened near current day Upper Heidelberg Road in 1854.

The homestead "Chelsworth" was built in 1860 and was an early farming property. The origins of the property are traced to 1846 when Patrick Stevenson operated a local dairy farm.  The house now forms part of the Ivanhoe Golf Course.

Ivanhoe Post Office opened on 1 September 1874. Ivanhoe North Post Office, on Waterdale Road near Banksia Street opened on 17 May 1926. An Ivanhoe West Post Office was open from 1955 until 1988.

Many streets in the area derive their names from characters in the novel Ivanhoe by Sir Walter Scott.

The main station building of Ivanhoe train station was built in 1888.

In 1913, the property "Clarivue" was built, described as "the grandest of the early medieval domestic revival houses in Heidelberg". In about 1962 it became the home of the Ivanhoe RSL sub-branch. In April 2017,a major fire took hold of the building. As of March 2022, the heritage-listed Queen Ann style building located in Studley Road has remained untouched since, without repair or restoration. 

In 1937 the Heidelberg Town Hall at Ivanhoe was opened. It was noted at the time to be "one of the most noteworthy contributions made to suburban architecture in some years". The building features deeply recessed windows and doorways, a clock tower, main hall with seating accommodation for 1,000 people, laid with parquetry wood blocks, carpeted lounges, a full-size concert platform with dressing rooms, concealed lighting, a supper room,  a large foyer, cloak rooms and a meeting-room or third hall beind the main hall. There was also a kitchen.  Steps lead up to the municipal offices and council chamber for the Heidelberg City Council.

In 1938, the Heidelberg Children's Free Library, in the Heidelberg Town Hall at Ivanhoe was opened. 

In the mid-1960s, the annual Boulevard Christmas lights event has taken place where dozen's of houses in The Boulevard, Ivanhoe are decorated for Christmas. It began as a community event for local residents.  Banyule City Council became involved in later years. 

Ivanhoe library opened on 8 October 1965. It was demolished and replaced on the same site next to the historic Town Hall with the Ivanhoe Library and Cultural Hub opening in 2021.

Population
In the 2016 Census, there were 12,171 people in Ivanhoe. 69.2% of people were born in Australia. The next most common countries of birth were China 3.6%, England 2.6%, India 2.2%, Italy 2.1% and New Zealand 1.3%. 71.0% of people spoke only English at home. Other languages spoken at home included Mandarin 4.4%, Greek 3.6%, Italian 3.5%, Cantonese 1.5% and Spanish 0.9%. The most common responses for religion were No Religion 38.2% and Catholic 26.5%.

Geography
The Yarra River forms the southern boundary of the suburb, with a golf course and a narrow riparian strip reserve. Darebin Creek runs along the western boundary of the suburb.

Facilities 

The Ivanhoe shopping centre strip along Upper Heidelberg road is of local historical and social significance.  Some buildings were built in the 19th century, but most are form the period 1915-1940.

Ivanhoe Library & Cultural Hub was completed in February 2021. The state-of-the-art building includes a modern accessible library, an art gallery, conference and meeting spaces, maternal and child health consulting suits, an informal theatrette and a cafe.  It has also incorporated a major redevelopment of the existing heritage listed town hall. Its value is stated as $31 million. Banyule U3A use it as one of its venues. Ivanhoe Library              is managed by Yarra Plenty Regional Library.

Hatch Contemporary Arts Space is managed by Banyule City Council but closed in early 2021.

Ivanhoe Reading Circle is Melbourne's longest running bookclub

The Centre Ivanhoe (part of the former Heidelberg Town Hall) is an events venue

Upper Heidelberg Road Commercial Centre

Upper Heidelberg Road is the suburb's centre and the location of the former Heidelberg Town Hall, now known as The Centre Ivanhoe. The town hall is a classic 'art-deco' building on top of a hill, with a green neon clockface on a tower.

Transport
The suburb has two railway stations; Ivanhoe, which is located in the Zone 1 and 2 overlap of the public transport system and Darebin, wholly within Zone 1, is also located in the suburb.

Education
The suburb has two private schools; Ivanhoe Grammar School, established in 1915 and Ivanhoe Girls' Grammar School. It is also home to one of Victoria's oldest state schools, Ivanhoe Primary School, established in 1853. The Victorian State Government, through the Department of Education, closed Bellfield Primary School at 229 Banksia Street, Ivanhoe and sold the site to Banyule City Council in August 2013. The housing development by Stockland was built on the site.

Sporting clubs
Ivanhoe City Soccer Club est. 2015
Ivanhoe Amateur Football Club since 1910
Old Ivanhoe Grammarians Football Club est.1964
Ivanhoe Knights Basketball Club
Ivanhoe Junior Football Club
Old Ivanhoe Grammarians Cricket Club
West Ivanhoe United Cricket Club
Ivanhoe Cricket Club
Ivanhoe Harriers Athletics Club
Ivanhoe Bowls Club est. 1912
Ivanhoe Golf Course on Vasey Street.
Ivanhoe Park Croquet Club was established in 1913.

Notable people
 Sharin Anderson - musician, born in Ivanhoe
 Carrie Bickmore - Ivanhoe resident.
 Cate Blanchett - Grew up in Ivanhoe.
 Sam Bramham - Paralympic gold medalist lives in Ivanhoe.
 Brodie Grundy - Ivanhoe resident.
 Peter Helliar - Ivanhoe resident.
 Carol Jerrems (1949-1980) - photographer, born and grew up in Ivanhoe.
 The Nervo Twins

See also
 City of Heidelberg – Ivanhoe was previously within this former local government area.

References

External links
Local History of Ivanhoe

Suburbs of Melbourne
Suburbs of the City of Banyule